The U.S. state of South Carolina is made up of 46 counties, the maximum allowable by state law. They range in size from 359 square miles (930 square kilometers) in the case of Calhoun County to 1,358 square miles (3,517 square kilometers) in the case of Charleston County. The least populous county is Allendale County, with only 7,858 residents, while the most populous county is Greenville County, with a population of 533,834, despite the state's most populous city, Charleston, being located in Charleston County.

History
In the colonial period, the land around the coast was divided into parishes corresponding to the parishes of the Church of England. There were also several counties that had judicial and electoral functions. As people settled the backcountry, judicial districts and additional counties were formed. This structure continued and grew after the Revolutionary War. In 1800, all counties were renamed as districts. In 1868, the districts were converted back to counties. The South Carolina Department of Archives and History has maps that show the boundaries of counties, districts, and parishes starting in 1682.

Historically, county government in South Carolina has been fairly weak. The 1895 Constitution made no provision for local government, effectively reducing counties to creatures of the state. Each county's delegation to the General Assembly, comprising one senator and at least one representative, also doubled as its county council. Under this system, the state senator from each county wielded the most power. From the eighteenth century to 1973, counties in South Carolina performed limited functions such as the provision of law enforcement and the construction of transportation infrastructure.

In 1964, the United States Supreme Court case Reynolds v. Sims required reapportionment according to the principle of "one man, one vote", which resulted in legislative districts crossing county lines. However, it was not until 1973 that the constitution was amended to provide for limited home rule at the county level. This was finally enacted in 1975 with the Home Rule Act, which provided for elected councils in each county. Further, in 1989, all counties were given the authority to exercise broad police powers. Thus, they may enact regulations and ordinances related to the provision or preservation of security, health, peace, and order, so long as the regulation is not inconsistent with state law. Nonetheless, all counties and municipalities in South Carolina lack “fiscal home rule,” meaning they may only enact taxes authorized by the General Assembly.  

County ordinances become applicable within municipal boundaries when the municipality and the county make a formal agreement, and the municipality formally adopts the ordinance. Unincorporated areas are governed by the county’s land use plans.

County Abbreviations

Alphabetical list 

|}

Defunct parishes, counties and districts

Parishes
Until the late 19th century, the South Carolina Lowcountry was divided into parishes which in turn were subdivided several "districts"; these civil parishes were based on and generally coincident (even well after disestablishment) with Anglican ecclesiastical parishes.

 St. Helena's Parish (Beaufort District)
 St. Luke's Parish (Beaufort District) created on May 23, 1767, located on Hilton Head Island and the adjacent mainland
 St. Peter's Parish (Beaufort District)
 Prince William Parish (Beaufort District)
 St. Andrew's Parish (Charleston District)
 St. Bartholomew's Parish (Charleston District)
 St. John's Colleton Parish (Charleston District)
 St. George's Dorchester Parish (Charleston District)
 St. Philip's & St. Michael's Parish (Charleston District)
 Christchurch Parish (Charleston District)
 St. James' Goose Creek Parish (Charleston District)
 St. Thomas' & St. Denis' Parish (Charleston District)
 St. John's Berkeley Parish (Charleston District)
 St. Stephen's Parish (Charleston District)
 St. James' Santee Parish (Charleston District)
 St. Paul's Parish (Charleston District)
 All Saints' Parish (Georgetown District)
 Prince George, Winyah, Parish (Georgetown District)
 Prince Frederick Parish (Georgetown District)
 St. David's Parish (Cheraw District)
 St. Mark's Parish (Cheraw District)
 St. Matthew's Parish (Orangeburgh District)

Counties
 Carteret County
 Craven County
 Granville County
 Orange County
 Lewisburg County 1785-1791
 Winton County present-day Barnwell County
 Liberty County present-day Marion County
 Winyah County former name of Georgetown County
 Claremont County
 Salem County

Districts
 Cheraw District created in 1769
 Camden District created in 1769
 Ninety-Six District created in 1769
 Pinckney District 1791-1798
 Washington District 1785-1798
 Pendleton District created in 1789 from Cherokee lands

Proposed counties
 Birch County proposed in 2013 (portions of Lexington and Richland counties)

See also 

 List of municipalities in South Carolina
 List of ghost towns in South Carolina
 List of former United States counties

Notes

References
Landrum, John Belton O'Neall  (1897) Colonial and revolutionary history of upper South Carolina: embracing for the most part the primitive and colonial history of the territory comprising the original county of Spartanburg with a general review of the entire military operations in the upper portion of South Carolina and portions of North Carolina Shannon and Company, Greenville, South Carolina,

External links
 Information on County Formation timeline
 Complete South Carolina County Guide
 Map of former parishes of South Carolina South Carolina Department of Archives and History

South Carolina, counties in

Counties